The lithium depletion boundary (LDB) technique is a method proposed for dating open clusters based on a determination of the lithium abundances of a cluster's stars whose masses are at about the hydrogen burning mass limit.

References

Open clusters